This is an incomplete list of Griffith University people, inclusive of the university's Queensland Conservatorium, and includes alumni and staff.

Alumni

Academia

 Brian Fitzgerald, academic and barrister, with expertise in cyber law at the Australian Catholic University
 Peter Monteath, historian and academic at Flinders University
 Thomas O'Regan, academic in culture and media studies at the University of Queensland

Business

 Greg Clark, CEO of Symantec
 Rajnesh Singh, Fijian entrepreneur

Government

Politicians

 Jim Chalmers, politician
 Anthony Chisholm, Senator for Queensland
 Peta-Kaye Croft, former state politician
 Mick de Brenni, state politician and minister
 Justine Elliot, federal politician
 Leeanne Enoch, state politician and minister
 Andrew Fraser, former state politician and Deputy Premier; winner of the University Medal
 Gary Hardgrave, former federal politician and minister; and later, Administrator of Norfolk Island
 Joanna Lindgren, former Senator for Queensland
 Matt McEachan, former state politician
 James McGrath, Senator for Queensland and assistant minister
 Aidan McLindon, former state politician
 Lisa Neville, Victorian state politician and minister
 Julie Owens, federal politician
 Duncan Pegg,  state politician
 Ted Radke, former state politician
 Phil Reeves, former state politician and minister
 Mark Robinson, state politician
 Meaghan Scanlon, state politician
 Judy Spence, former state politician and former minister
 Amanda Stoker, Senator for Queensland and barrister
 Jackie Trad, state politician and the former Deputy Premier of Queensland
 Ross Vasta, federal politician
 Larissa Waters, former federal politician

Civil servants

Dayan Jayatilleka, Sri Lankan academic, diplomat, writer and politician

Humanities

Arts

 Tony Albert, contemporary indigenous artist
 Daniel Amalm, musician and actor and alumnus of the Queensland Conservatorium
 Garry Andrews, contemporary artist
 Jason Barry-Smith, operatic baritone, vocal coach, composer, arranger, and alumnus of the Queensland Conservatorium
 Betty Beath, composer, pianist, and music educator, and alumnus of the Queensland Conservatorium
 Robert Braiden, film director
 Liz Cantor, television personality
 Ray Chen, violinist and alumnus of the Queensland Conservatorium
 Gerry Connolly, comedian, actor, impressionist, pianist, and alumnus of the Queensland Conservatorium
 Sarah Crane, operatic soprano and alumnus of the Queensland Conservatorium
 Brett Dean, composer, violist, and conductor, and alumnus of the Queensland Conservatorium
 Emma Dean, singer-songwriter and multi-instrumentalist and alumnus of the Queensland Conservatorium
 Lucy DeCoutere, Canadian actress
 Candy Devine, broadcaster, singer, and actress, and alumnus of the Queensland Conservatorium
 Diana Doherty, oboist and alumnus of the Queensland Conservatorium
 Robin Donald, operatic tenor and alumnus of the Queensland Conservatorium
 Helen Donaldson, operatic soprano and alumnus of the Queensland Conservatorium
 Lisa Gasteen , internationally acclaimed Australian operatic soprano, and alumnus of the Queensland Conservatorium
 Jayson Gillham, classical pianist and alumnus of the Queensland Conservatorium
 Dami Im, singer-songwriter, multi-instrumentalist performing artist, who represented Australia at Eurovision 2016
 Graeme Jennings, classical pianist and music educator, and alumnus of the Queensland Conservatorium
 Natalie Jeremijenko, experimental design artist 
 Jung Ryeo-won, actress and singer
 Kanon, singer-songwriter and alumnus of the Queensland Conservatorium
 Piers Lane , internationally acclaimed classical pianist and alumnus of the Queensland Conservatorium
 Adam Lopez, pop musician, vocal coach, and session vocalist, and alumnus of the Queensland Conservatorium
 Mirusia Louwerse, soprano and alumnus of the Queensland Conservatorium
 Tahu Matheson, pianist and conductor, and alumnus of the Queensland Conservatorium
 Kate Miller-Heidke, singer-songwriter and actress, and alumnus of the Queensland Conservatorium
 Katie Noonan, singer-songwriter and alumnus of the Queensland Conservatorium
 Barnaby Ralph, professional virtuoso recorder player and alumnus of the Queensland Conservatorium
 John Rodgers, composer, improviser, violinist, pianist and guitarist, and alumnus of the Queensland Conservatorium
 Van Thanh Rudd, artist and activist
 Aravinnd Singh, Indian cinematographer
 Barry Singh, artistic director and conductor, and alumnus of the Queensland Conservatorium
 Rosario La Spina, operatic tenor and alumnus of the Queensland Conservatorium
 Alaric Tay, Singaporean director, producer and actor
 Amanda Ware, model
 Robert Warren, musician
 Megan Washington, musician and songwriter, and alumnus of the Queensland Conservatorium
 Jonathon Welch , choral conductor, opera singer and voice teacher, and alumnus of the Queensland Conservatorium
 JVMIE, singer-songwriter and music producer, and alumnus of the Queensland Conservatorium
 Christopher Wrench, organist and lecturer, and alumnus of the Queensland Conservatorium

 Brett Yang, Violinist, YouTuber {Twosetviolin}
 Eddy Chen, Violinist, YouTuber {Twosetviolin}

History
 Peter Monteath, historian and academic at Flinders University

Journalism and media

 Alex Deane, political commentator
 Adam Ferguson, photojournalist
 Natalie Gruzlewski, television presenter
 Andrew Lofthouse, co-presenter of Nine News Queensland
 Karen Tso, television journalist and anchor at CNBC Europe

Literature, writing and poetry

 Philip Dean, playwright
 Brentley Frazer, contemporary poet and author
 Nujoom Al-Ghanem, Emirati poet and film director
 Stefanja Orlowska, writer and actress
 Robyn Sheahan-Bright, author and publisher of children's literature
 Heather Smith, author and accountant 
 Ken Spillman, author
 David Vernon, author

Philosophy and theology
 John Fleming, initially an Anglican minister; later, Catholic priest; subsequently banned from practising ministry
 James Page, anthropologist and peace educator 
 Nick Vujicic, Christian evangelist and motivational speaker

Law
 Anika Wells, formerly an advisor to the federal government, and then a compensation; later a member of the Australian House of Representatives representing the Division of Lilley.

Medicine and sciences
 Mark Elgar, ecologist
 Dinesh Palipana, doctor; disability advocate; first quadriplegic intern in Queensland; second quadriplegic medical graduate in Australia
 Vanessa Lee-AhMat, the first Aboriginal and Torres Strait Islander PhD graduate from the School of Medicine.

Sport

 Deborah Acason, weightlifter and criminologist
 Liz Blatchford, triathlete and marine biologist
 Steven Bradbury , short track speed skater and Olympic gold medallist
 Sara Carrigan, cyclist
 Naomi Castle, water polo player and Olympic gold medallist
 Duncan Free , rower and Olympic gold medallist
 Jeff Horn, professional boxer and former school teacher
 Michael Jeh, former Sri Lankan cricketer
 Katie Kelly , paratriathlete and 2016 Rio Paralympics gold medallist
 Emma McKeon , swimmer and Olympic and Commonwealth Games gold medallist
 Anna-Liza Mopio-Jane, Papua New Guinean swimmer
 Simone Nalatu, Fiji-Australian netball player
 Libby Trickett , retired swimmer and Olympic gold medallist
 Brandon Wakeling, weightlifter

Other

 Alex James, electrical engineer and author
 Tania Major, Aboriginal activist
 Bo Songvisava, chef and restaurateur
 Felicity Wishart, conservationist and environmental activist

Administration

Chancellors

Vice-Chancellors

Faculty
 Ralf Altmeyer, German virologist
 Donald K. Anton, Chair of International Law
 Lisa Gasteen , internally acclaimed Australian operatic soprano
 Graeme Jennings, classical pianist and music educator
Susanne Karstedt, criminologist
 Nigel Krauth, author, scholar and editor
 Alan Mackay-Sim, biomedical scientist, 2017 Australian of the Year
 Jason Nelson, pioneering digital poet and artist
 Charles Page, photographer
 Don Smith  (1920–1998), former operatic tenor and a singing teacher; father of Robin Donald
 Nicki Packer, Australian glycobiologist, Principal Research Leader at the Institute for Glycomics

References 

Griffith University people
Griffith